Diplodia theae-sinensis is a plant pathogen.

References

External links
USDA ARS Fungal Database

Fungal plant pathogens and diseases
Botryosphaeriales
Fungi described in 1988